The ports of Brazil are overseen by the Brazilian Ministry of Transport.

The Port of Santos near São Paulo is the busiest container port in Latin America and the 37th busiest in the world. Situated on the left margin of the Port of Santos, Tecon Santos (Santos Brasil) is considered a benchmark in matters of efficiency in South America and holds the highest average MPH (movements per hour) in Latin America: 81.86. The terminal has 596,000 square meters and a capacity to handle 2 million TEUs per year.

See also
 Santos Brasil
 Brazilian Ministry of Transport

References

External links
 Brazilian Ministry of Transport 

 
Port cities in Brazil